Tazolol is a beta blocker with some utility in the treatment of heart disease.

See also 
Timolol
Niridazole
Fenclozic acid

References 

Antiarrhythmic agents
Beta blockers
2-Thiazolyl compounds
Ethers
Secondary alcohols
Secondary amines
Abandoned drugs
Isopropylamino compounds